Thompson Mill Covered Bridge is a covered bridge which crosses the Kaskaskia River  northeast of Cowden, Illinois. The bridge was constructed in 1868; it was built in Michigan, shipped to Shelbyville, and hauled to the river crossing by horse-drawn wagons. The road the bridge carried was an important transportation corridor connecting Springfield, Taylorville, and Effingham. The bridge also provided area residents access to the Thompson Mill, a corn mill and sawmill which operated from 1843 to 1914.

The bridge was added to the National Register of Historic Places on March 13, 1975. It is now one of only five historic covered bridges remaining in Illinois. The bridge has been closed to automobile traffic but remains open to pedestrians.

See also
List of covered bridges in Illinois

References

Covered bridges on the National Register of Historic Places in Illinois
Bridges completed in 1868
Buildings and structures in Shelby County, Illinois
National Register of Historic Places in Shelby County, Illinois
Road bridges on the National Register of Historic Places in Illinois
Wooden bridges in Illinois
Howe truss bridges in the United States